Kahrud (also Romanized as Kahrūd and Kohrūd; also known as Kahrūd-e Bālā) is a village in Larijan-e Sofla Rural District, Larijan District, Amol County, Mazandaran Province, Iran. At the 2006 census, its population was 121, in 42 families.

References 

Populated places in Amol County